Major General Robert H. "Shorty" Soule (February 10, 1900 – January 26, 1952) was a senior officer in the United States Army. He commanded the 188th Glider Infantry Regiment of the 11th Airborne Division in the Philippines campaign during World War II. He later served as military attaché to the Republic of China, and commanded the 3rd Infantry Division during the Korean War. Soule died of a heart attack in Washington, D.C. He is buried at Arlington National Cemetery with his wife Genevieve Hoffman Soule (1898–1992).

References

Other sources
 Flanagan, Edward M. (1986) The Los Baños Raid: The 11th Airborne Jumps at Dawn (Presidio Books)  
 Flanagan, Edward M (1988) The Angels: A History of the 11th Airborne Division 1943–1946 (The Battery Press) 
 Salecker, Gene Eric (2010) Blossoming Silk Against the Rising Sun: U.S. and Japanese Paratroopers at War in the Pacific in World War II (Stackpole Books) 
 Henderson, Bruce (2015) Rescue at Los Baños: The Most Daring Prison Camp Raid of World War II (William Morrow)

External links
Entry on American Battle Monuments Commission website
Entry on MilitaryTimes Hall of Valor website

Generals of World War II

1900 births
1952 deaths
United States Army personnel of the Korean War
Burials at Arlington National Cemetery
People from Laramie, Wyoming
Recipients of the Distinguished Service Cross (United States)
Recipients of the Distinguished Service Medal (US Army)
Recipients of the Legion of Merit
Recipients of the Silver Star
United States Army generals
United States Army generals of World War II